Coptops liturata is a species of beetle in the family Cerambycidae. It was described by Johann Christoph Friedrich Klug in 1833, originally under the genus Lamia. It is known from Madagascar.

References

liturata
Beetles described in 1833